Rob Wasserman (April 1, 1952 – June 29, 2016) was an American composer and bass player.  A Grammy Award and NEA grant winner, he played and recorded with a wide variety of musicians including Bob Weir, Bruce Cockburn, Elvis Costello, Ani di Franco, Jerry Garcia, David Grisman, Stéphane Grappelli, Rickie Lee Jones, Van Morrison, Aaron Neville, Lou Reed, Pete Seeger, Jules Shear, Brian Wilson, Chris Whitley, Neil Young, Jackson Browne, Laurie Anderson, Stephen Perkins, Banyan, Mystic Knights of the Oingo Boingo, and Ratdog.

He is best known for his own work on the trilogy of albums, Solo, Duets, and Trios.

Life and career
Wasserman started playing violin, and graduated to the bass after his teenage years. He studied at the San Francisco Conservatory of Music where he studied composing with John Adams and double bass with San Francisco Symphony bassists.

He worked with Van Morrison, Oingo Boingo, and  David Grisman. His 1983 album Solo won Down Beat magazine's Record of the Year award. On the albums Duets and Trios, he worked with Bobby McFerrin, Rickie Lee Jones, Cheryl Bentyne, Lou Reed, Stéphane Grappelli, Jerry Garcia, Brian Wilson, Willie Dixon, Branford Marsalis, Bob Weir, Edie Brickell, Les Claypool, Neil Young, and Elvis Costello.

Duets was nominated for three Grammy Awards. Bobby McFerrin won for "Brothers", which was performed with Wasserman. Wasserman also won Holland's Edison Award for Record of the Year.

His 2000 album, Space Island, incorporated more contemporary musical elements. RatDog, which he co-founded with Bob Weir from the Grateful Dead, occupied much of his time. He toured extensively with Lou Reed.

Wasserman was a judge for the sixth-tenth annual Independent Music Awards.

He died on June 29, 2016. Cause of death was cancer.

Discography

As leader
 Solo (Rounder, 1983)
 Duets (MCA, 1988)
 Trios (GRP, 1994)
 Space Island (Atlantic, 2000)
 Cosmic Farm (Tone Center, 2005)

As co-leader
 Live, with Bob Weir (1999)
 Fall 1989: The Long Island Sound, with Bob Weir and  Jerry Garcia Band (2013)
 Dua, with Sultan Khan (2001)

As sideman
With David Grisman
 Quintet '80 1980
 Stephane Grappelli/David Grisman Live with Stéphane Grappelli (1981)
 Mondo Mando (1981)

With  Lou Reed
 New York (1989)
 Magic and Loss  (1992)
 Lulu with Metallica (2011)

With Rickie Lee Jones
 Flying Cowboys (1989)
 Naked Songs – Live and Acoustic (1995)

With others
 Beautiful Vision, Van Morrison (1982)
 Mighty Like a Rose, Elvis Costello (1991)
 The Original Wang Dang Doodle, Willie Dixon (1995)
 The Charity of Night, Bruce Cockburn (1996)
 Evening Moods, RatDog (2000)
 Live at Roseland, RatDog (2001)
  Summertime,  Nineteen Thirteen (2015)

References

1952 births
2016 deaths
People from San Mateo, California
American rock double-bassists
Male double-bassists
Musicians from the San Francisco Bay Area
San Francisco Conservatory of Music alumni
RatDog members
David Grisman Quintet members